Jens Johannessen (born 15 November 1934) is a Norwegian painter and graphical artist.

He was born in Orkdal. He studied at the Norwegian National Academy of Fine Arts under Reidar Aulie from 1958 to 1961. He is represented in various galleries, including the National Gallery of Norway, Riksgalleriet, and the Taipei Fine Arts Museum. His book illustrations include Peder Wright Cappelen's Høstblad (1976) and Fugl i vår (1979). He was awarded the Prince Eugen Medal in 1993, and was decorated Commander of the Order of St. Olav in 1998.

References

1934 births
Living people
People from Orkdal
Norwegian illustrators
Oslo National Academy of the Arts alumni
20th-century Norwegian painters
21st-century Norwegian painters
Norwegian male painters
20th-century Norwegian male artists
21st-century Norwegian male artists